Jacobo Sanz Ovejero (born 10 July 1983), known simply as Jacobo, is a Spanish former footballer who played as a goalkeeper.

A controversial figure, he played 68 Segunda División matches over five seasons, representing Valladolid, Numancia and Tenerife in the competition. He appeared for Getafe and Valladolid in La Liga, and also competed professionally in Greece.

Club career

Valladolid and Numancia
Jacobo was born in Valladolid. A product of Real Valladolid's youth system – he joined the club at the age of only seven – he served two loan stints before returning in the 2005–06 season, with the Castile and León club in Segunda División. He would only be third choice during that period, and his official debut occurred on 1 October 2005 in a 3–2 away win over Real Madrid Castilla; his second league game was also against that opponent, five months later (1–0 home victory).

In 2007–08, Jacobo contributed 32 games to CD Numancia's return to La Liga after a three-year absence. He had been signed to a two-year deal with Valladolid keeping two re-buy options on the player, and conceded just 28 goals during the campaign, only trailing CD Castellón's Carlos Sánchez in the Ricardo Zamora Trophy race.

Getafe
Jacobo returned to Valladolid in July 2008, signing a new three-year contract. However, injuries to Getafe CF's keepers, Argentines Roberto Abbondanzieri (a couple of weeks) and Oscar Ustari (eight months) prompted a loan request by the Madrid side, which was accepted. On 14 September, after having received the latter's nº1 jersey, he made his debut for the club, keeping a clean sheet in a 0–0 home draw with Real Betis.

From January 2009 onwards, as Abbondanzieri returned to Boca Juniors, Jacobo was reinstated as starter, first appearing on the 25th in a 5–1 home win against Sporting de Gijón. In 2009–10 he alternated with Paraguayan Justo Villar when healthy, but Valladolid finished 18th with 62 goals against (the fourth-worst defensive record) and dropped down back to the second division.

Greece
In July 2011, after a failed transfer to Celtic – the Scottish team had already shown interest in the player the previous summer– Jacobo joined several compatriots at Asteras Tripolis F.C. in Greece, signing a two-year contract. On 27 November, he was named Player of the match in a 2–0 home defeat of Olympiacos FC.

On 21 April 2012, after the Super League season was over, Jacobo was released by Asteras supposedly to move to Everton in England, and had subsequent trials in the country with Charlton Athletic and Middlesbrough in the ensuing summer. Nothing came of it and, eventually, he stayed in Greece and joined PAOK FC for one year.

On 18 November 2012, Jacobo was sent off in a game against Panathinaikos F.C. and, subsequently, was subjected to the club's disciplinary proceedings, being reinstated after issuing an apology. In June of the following year he renewed his contract for three more years but, in November, after a new case of misconduct, this time involving the club's trainer, was again suspended. Coach Huub Stevens commented on the incident: “There was an incident in yesterday’s training. Believe me, patience is the best way to deal with such matters, but it was not the first time he overreacted and that is unacceptable. That’s why we banned him from training until Monday. I hope he will reflect on his behaviour and learn from it”.

Jacobo was loaned to CD Tenerife back in his country for the 2014–15 campaign. On 14 November, however, he left the club after having a confrontation with teammate Cristo González, also being deemed surplus to requirements at PAOK.

On 17 January 2017, after years battling several injury problems, the 33-year-old Jacobo announced his retirement. He expressed a desire to remain connected to the sport as a goalkeeper coach, and started working in that capacity with Internacional de Madrid CF and Aarhus Gymnastikforening.

Honours
Valladolid
Segunda División: 2006–07

Numancia
Segunda División: 2007–08

References

External links

1983 births
Living people
Spanish footballers
Footballers from Valladolid
Association football goalkeepers
La Liga players
Segunda División players
Segunda División B players
Real Valladolid Promesas players
CF Palencia footballers
Real Jaén footballers
Real Valladolid players
CD Numancia players
Getafe CF footballers
CD Tenerife players
Super League Greece players
Asteras Tripolis F.C. players
PAOK FC players
Spanish expatriate footballers
Expatriate footballers in Greece
Spanish expatriate sportspeople in Greece
Spanish expatriate sportspeople in Denmark